Mesita may refer to:

Mesita, Colorado
Mesita, New Mexico
Mesita (musical project)
Casa Mesita, two separate non-profit organizations in Los Alamos, New Mexico
MESITA, a nuclear detonation test conducted as part or Operation Toggle on May 9, 1973

See also
 Meseta (disambiguation)